Jonas Wiesen (born 18 July 1996) is a German coxswain. He has won medals at several World Rowing Championships.

References

1996 births
Living people
Coxswains (rowing)
German male rowers
World Rowing Championships medalists for Germany